is a private university in Okazaki, Aichi, Japan, established in 2000.  It has an associated private Junior High School and High School.

References

External links
 
 Official website 

Educational institutions established in 2000
Private universities and colleges in Japan
Universities and colleges in Aichi Prefecture
Okazaki, Aichi
2000 establishments in Japan